Radio Birdman is an Australian punk rock band formed by Deniz Tek and Rob Younger in Sydney in 1974. The group influenced the work of many successful, mainstream bands, and are now considered instrumental in Australia's musical growth.

History

Origins 
Deniz Tek and Rob Younger formed Radio Birdman in mid-1974 in Sydney, having recently left their bands TV Jones and the Rats respectively. The pair sought to begin a band that would challenge the commercial mainstream and be completely uncompromising. They recruited classical keyboard player Philip "Pip" Hoyle, drummer Ron Keeley and bassist Carl Rorke. The band took their name from a misheard lyric from the Stooges' song "1970" (the actual lyric is "radio burnin'").

After being rejected many times from various venues, and having resorted to putting on its own concerts in rented garages and tiny community halls, by mid 1975 Radio Birdman found an upstairs room at the Oxford Tavern in Taylor Square, Sydney. They eventually took over its management, renaming it The Funhouse. Under their management the Funhouse became a home to other outsider groups. Prior to the opening of this venue, Carl Rorke had left the band and was replaced by longtime friend of Rob Younger, Warwick Gilbert (also a former Rats member). Also to leave the band would be Philip Hoyle, though his departure was short-lived. Guitarist Chris Masuak was initially hired to replace Hoyle.

Soon a small but growing subculture grew around Radio Birdman. This coincided with the beginnings of the Sydney punk scene.

After unsuccessfully trying several studios, Radio Birdman found a supportive recording milieu with the help of Rock Australia Magazine editor, Anthony O'Grady. They recorded an EP, Burn My Eye, and their first album Radios Appear, produced by John L Sayers and Charles Fisher at Trafalgar Studios in Annandale. Trafalgar Studios, under the management of Michael McMartin, signed the band and financed the recordings. Radios Appear was critically acclaimed, getting 5 stars in the Australian Rolling Stone edition. The album owed much of its style to Detroit bands of the late 1960s, such as the MC5 and the Stooges, as well as influences ranging from the Doors to the Velvet Underground and instrumental surf music. The title of the album comes from a Blue Öyster Cult song "Dominance and Submission" from their 1974 Secret Treaties album, influences from which can also be seen in Birdman's creative output. Though Radios Appear was totally ignored by commercial radio, it was championed by Sydney station 2JJ (Double Jay). Released on the newly created, purpose-built independent label Trafalgar Records, the album was made available through mail-order and was self distributed by band members and friends to a few sympathetic record stores, never achieving widespread sales or commercial success. Several years after initial release, and following the breakup of the band, Trafalgar Records licensed the recordings to WEA who took on the album and gave it a wider release.  However, sales remained limited. Despite critical acclaim, some fans felt the recordings lacked the ferocity and immediacy of the live shows and did not represent their own intense experience of the band.

The band remained outside the mainstream, and developed an outlaw reputation. By late 1976 they began to travel to other cities to perform their shows, with several mini-tours taking in Canberra, Melbourne and Adelaide. In early 1977 keyboard player Pip Hoyle returned to the band, and his replacement, Chris Masuak, stayed in the lineup, making Radio Birdman a six-piece band for the first time.

When Sire Records president Seymour Stein came to Australia to sign Brisbane punk band the Saints, he saw Radio Birdman and immediately invited them to join his label. Under Sire, licensed by Trafalgar, Radio Birdman released a new version of Radios Appear featuring a mixture of re-mixed, re-recorded and some new material. Comparisons between the two versions of the album are disputed with some feeling that the second version is a more accurate reflection of the band's sound. Most fans however own both versions and simply treat them as two separate and different recordings.

The underground scene at the Funhouse, now incorporating the nascent punk movement, began to attract some groups with negative agendas, including the Sydney chapter of the Hells Angels. With this new, more violent, and rowdy crowd, and over capacity every night, the Funhouse was at the point of exploding. The band was blamed for violent incidents occurring at the Funhouse, and were concerned that a disaster was in the making. Following a concert at Paddington Town Hall with the Saints and the Hot Spurs, in April 1977, attended by a few hundred people, they left the Sydney scene altogether, playing sporadically in other cities and working on new material.

The band returned half a year later and performed their most famous show to date at Paddington Town Hall, on 12 December 1977. Two thousand people supposedly packed into the venue, which was partially destroyed by crazed fans. After this show, the band moved their base of operations to London, and toured extensively in the UK and Europe, both headlining and as support for Sire label-mates the Flamin' Groovies. Their overseas success was short-lived as Sire Records began having financial difficulties and were forced to drop Radio Birdman and many other bands from their label. A planned American tour with Ramones, scheduled for the second half of 1978, was cancelled. In May 1978, they recorded their second album Living Eyes at Rockfield Studio in Wales. Unreleased by Sire, the tapes eventually were released in 1981, long after the band's 1978 break-up.

Breakup 
Without a label, with no tour support and no distribution for Radios Appear, the band continued on, while suffering deteriorating interpersonal relations. Radio Birdman played one last show at Oxford University in June 1978, after which the band split up – on the eve of an explosion of independent music in Australia, which they had played a large role in creating.

1978–1996 
All six members went on to other bands. Younger's the Other Side and later New Christs was more oriented towards hard rock. Tek and Keeley with keyboardist Pip Hoyle formed the Doors-influenced inner city band the Visitors, and guitarist Chris Masuak and bass guitarist Warwick Gilbert's the Hitmen went on to moderate success in the Australian pub rock scene. Tek, Younger and Gilbert played in a one-shot touring band called New Race, with Dennis Thompson of the MC5 and Ron Asheton of the Stooges. They made no studio recordings, but released one official "live" album, The First and Last, and there are two more "bootleg" live albums, The First to Pay and The Second Wave, on the French label Revenge. A non-musical LP, Soldiers of Rock 'n' Roll, was released in 1982. This strange album, described by the record company as "an audio documentary of Radio Birdman", was released after Deniz had quit music to be a jet pilot, and was assembled by the people at Trafalgar Records, like a soundtrack for a documentary movie which was never made. In 1990 Sheldon Booth (Melbourne Victoria) published Vivien Johnson's biography of the band Radio Birdman(ISBN 0731678397)', described by Deniz Tek as "the most accurate account I've ever seen of what happened in the band" and by Lindsay Hutton of The Next Big Thing as "the nearest thing to a Birdman Bible as we're ever likely to be blessed with". Reunion 
Radio Birdman reunited for the Big Day Out tour in 1996 and again in 1997. Since then Radio Birdman have continued to tour sporadically. In 2002 Warwick Gilbert was replaced by Jim Dickson who had previously played with the New Christs, Louis Tillett, the Passengers, the Barracudas and Deniz Tek. Drummer Ron Keeley left the band in 2004 after the band's poor performance at The Azkena Festival in Spain, and was temporarily replaced by Nik Reith, formerly of the Celibate Rifles, Tumbleweed, the New Christs and the Deniz Tek Group. He was replaced after six shows by You Am I drummer Russell Hopkinson.

The year 2006 saw much activity by Radio Birdman, spearheaded by the completion of a new album entitled Zeno Beach, released in Australia on 24 June 2006 via the band's own Crying Sun Records, and in the US via Yep Roc Records on 22 August. Named for the closing track, a surf-rock tune written by Hoyle, Zeno Beach was recorded in Sydney in December 2005, produced by guitarist Deniz Tek and engineer Greg Wales. Carl Rorke, the original Radio Birdman bassist, died the year of the new album's scheduled release, and it was dedicated to his memory.

Following a February tour of Australian capital cities, an extensive world tour of dates in support of Zeno Beach for Australia, New Zealand, Europe, and the US was accomplished, commencing 27 July 2006 in Sydney, and ending on 7 October. This successful tour marked the first time Radio Birdman played in America. Many Australian dates featured LA soul/punk band the Bellrays.

In July 2007 the band was inducted into the ARIA (Australian Recording Industry Association) Hall of Fame (in an interview, vocalist Rob Younger indicated the band had previously declined an invitation to join the Hall of Fame years before). The induction saw all living original members plus current members attend the ceremony, except for Pip Hoyle.

Daniel Johns of Silverchair gave the induction speech, which was followed by the band playing a short but energetic set of two songs which saw the audience giving them a standing ovation. The three guitarists (Tek, Masuak and Dickson) also participated in what appeared to be an uncharacteristically rehearsed stage move, each holding up their guitars and saluting the drums as the song New Race ascended into auditory chaos. On a side note, Murray Shepherd (ex-the Screaming Tribesmen and current the Hitmen drummer), sat in on drums for this occasion, as then-drummer Russell Hopkinson was touring with You Am I.

The band again toured Australia, the US, Canada and Europe, with approximately 80 concerts in 2007. In September 2007 the band featured in the Clash of the Titans tour alongside the Stems and Hoodoo Gurus, which launched in Sydney at the Enmore Theatre and included dates across Australia. Radio Birdman ceased touring after a long run of dates in Europe, ending in Athens, Greece in October 2007.

The band released a definitive box set on the Citadel label in 2014. The box set included 7 CDs and 1 DVD, featuring remasters of the band's official releases plus a wealth of archived and previously unheard studio material. The Box also contains a professional recording of the 12 December 1977 Paddington Town Hall concert. In November 2014, the band was reassembled to promote the release of the Box Set, and played shows across Australia. The 2014 lineup continues to this day, and features Nik Rieth on drums and Dave Kettley on guitar (replacing long time member Chris Masuak), along with Jim Dickson (bass) and original founding members Rob Younger, Pip Hoyle, and Deniz Tek. Radio Birdman remains active as of this writing, with European and Australian tours completed in 2015 and 2016.

The band is undertaking a joint national tour with Died Pretty in June and July 2017.

In 2017 Radio Birdman was the subject of a feature-length documentary Descent into the Maelstrom – The Radio Birdman Story. The film covered the band's history from precursor bands The Rats and TV Jones to their European tour in 2015. In December 2020, Radio Birdman were listed at number 44 in Rolling Stone Australias "50 Greatest Australian Artists of All Time" issue.

 Musical style 
 Lyrics 
The band's early lyrics sometimes referenced US-born guitarist/main songwriter Deniz Tek's home state of Michigan, with lyrics from tracks such as "Murder City Nights" referring to Woodward Avenue in Detroit, and "I-94" being the highway linking Chicago, Ann Arbor, and Detroit.

Many of their other songs, such as "Hand of Law" & "Descent into the Maelstrom" deal in apocalyptic images of war and violence, but these are more than balanced by the lighter popular culture references of tunes such as "Aloha Steve & Danno", an ode to the TV show Hawaii Five-O, and the light pop tune "More Fun". "Man With Golden Helmet"  (which Tek wrote in high school in America, inspired by the Rembrandt painting) is one of their most cryptic efforts: "Man with golden helmet/drinks water from the faucet... plays with tiny children/on his way home from work... he's the top man/in the language department." The lyrics range from deliberately obscurant, to simple storytelling.

 Genre 
Radio Birdman's music does not fit specifically with the punk rock genre, nor do the band like this label – though their outlaw stance and aggressive attitude has put them in this position. The band themselves classify their music simply as "rock and roll". Fans of the band often classed the music as "proto-punk" or the Detroit sound, similar to bands such as MC5 and the Stooges.

 Graphics 

With professional graphic artist Warwick Gilbert as part of the band, Radio Birdman had a unique and artistic feel to their cover art and posters. The band wanted to be unlike any other band in the way of presenting their image. The cover of the band's third album, Living Eyes, shows the style of design Radio Birdman often employed.

The band symbol was not an original Gilbert design. Deniz Tek created the logo when trying to develop a symbol for himself when he was with one of his early bands, T.V. Jones. He brought the logo with him when he formed Radio Birdman. Gilbert somewhat simplified Tek's original design, improving its usefulness as a logo.

The symbol was held by some as something to follow, many fans getting the symbol tattooed on their bodies. Many in the skateboard and surf subcultures have featured the symbol on their boards. Others saw it as something distasteful – the call sign of a forming cult. To some, the symbol recalled Nazi regalia. Tek has denied this, adamantly maintaining that the band and its music are apolitical, with no wish to present propaganda of any sort.

Crying Sun recordsCrying Sun Records' is the record company privately owned by Radio Birdman. Only a few albums have been released by this label including Radio Birdman's 1996 live album, Ritualism and their 2006 reunion album, Zeno Beach.

The label is named after the song "Crying Sun" by Radio Birdman on their 1981 studio album, Living Eyes. Crying Sun Records were originally based around Radio Birdman owned music venue turned bar, The Oxford Funhouse. Crying Sun Records was created by the band in association with Citadel Records to handle all the band's current and future recorded work. It was created to ensure that the band would be completely independent of record industry support or influence. This is seen as essential to maintaining the band's commitment to quality and fairness for the people who choose to listen.

The Crying Sun Records logo was designed by Radio Birdman bass player, Warwick Gilbert.

 Discography 
Studio albums

 Live albums 

 Compilations 

 Singles 

Documentary DVD
In 2018, the DVD documentary Descent into the Maelstrom: The Radio Birdman Story was released internationally; it also received an HD release on Vimeo and iTunes. It was written, directed and edited in Australia by Jonathan Sequeira, and produced by Mark Sequeira and Jonathan Sequeira. The documentary features live footage of the band and interviews with its various members and fans. The DVD was an official selection of the Detroit Freep Film Festival 2018, the Glasgow Film Festival 2018, the London Screensound Festival 2018, and the Manifesto Festival Amsterdam 2018. The Guardian'' called it "brutally honest', and I-94 Bar called it "the best rock documentary ever made".

References

External links 
 
 Radio Birdman on Trove, The National Library of Australia
 Zeno Beach Fan microsite 
 Divine Rites Fansite 
 Interview from Melbourne's Age Newspaper
 Music Australia Additional Information 
 Shock Records- Biography

ARIA Award winners
ARIA Hall of Fame inductees
Australian punk rock groups
Musical groups from Sydney
New South Wales musical groups
Protopunk groups
Pub rock musical groups
Sire Records artists